Franklin College may refer to:

in Switzerland
Franklin University Switzerland formerly known as Franklin College Switzerland

in the United Kingdom
Franklin College, Grimsby, England

in the United States
Franklin College (established 1787), Lancaster, Pennsylvania.  Known as "Franklin and Marshall College" since 1853
Franklin College of Arts and Sciences (established 1801), Athens, Georgia, a founding component of University of Georgia
Franklin College (Indiana) (established 1834), Franklin, Indiana
Franklin College (New Athens, Ohio), Harrison County, Ohio, a former college in village of New Athens that operated from 1818 to 1919
 Franklin College (Yale University), a residential college at Yale University
Franklin University (established 1902), Columbus, Ohio
Franklin College (Nashville) in Elm Crag area of Franklin, Tennessee outside Nashville, a Restorationist school founded by Tolbert Fanning